Colin Viljoen (born 20 June 1948) is a retired footballer who played in midfield for English teams Ipswich Town, Manchester City and Chelsea. Born in South Africa, he won two caps for England under manager Don Revie.

Biography
Born in Johannesburg, Viljoen was signed from Johannesburg Rangers' colts team by Ipswich in 1966. He spent 12 years at Portman Road, playing 305 games and  won two caps for England, both coming in a four-day spell in May 1975. A goalless draw with Northern Ireland in Belfast was followed by a 2–2 draw with Wales at Wembley, both games in the Home International Championship. Viljoen contributed to Ipswich's victorious 1977–78 FA Cup campaign, making four appearances and scoring twice during the run. However he was not part of the squad for the final itself. In 1978, he moved on to Manchester City, before signing for Chelsea for £60,000 in 1980. He was released by the club at the end of the 1981–82 season, and signed for non-League Southall.

Post-retirement life
After retiring, Viljoen bought and ran The Nine Styles pub in Uxbridge. He subsequently moved back to South Africa, first to Johannesburg, and then to Alberton, where he coaches youth football.

Honours
Individual
 Ipswich Town Player of the Year: 1974–75

See also
 List of England international footballers born outside England

References

1948 births
Soccer players from Johannesburg
English footballers
England international footballers
Ipswich Town F.C. players
Manchester City F.C. players
Chelsea F.C. players
Living people
Afrikaner people
South African people of Dutch descent
South African soccer players
South African emigrants to the United Kingdom
Southall F.C. players
English Football League players
Rangers F.C. (South Africa) players
Association football midfielders